Jennifer Prescod May-Parker (born 1964) is Chief of the Appellate Division of the United States Attorney's Office in the Eastern District of North Carolina and is a former nominee for United States district judge of the United States District Court for the Eastern District of North Carolina.

Education and career

May-Parker was born Jennifer Florizel Prescod in 1964, in Guyana, South America. She received a Bachelor of Arts degree in 1988 from the State University of New York at Geneseo. She received a Juris Doctor in 1991 from the University at Buffalo School of Law. She served as an Assistant District Attorney in the New York County District Attorney's Office from 1991 to 1998. From 1998 to 1999, she worked as an Assistant Attorney General in the Civil Environmental Division of the North Carolina Department of Justice. Since 1999, she has served as an Assistant United States Attorney in the Eastern District of North Carolina, serving as Chief of the Appellate Division since 2010. As an Assistant United States Attorney, she has prosecuted a broad spectrum of cases at both the trial and appellate level.

Expired nomination to district court

On June 20, 2013, President Obama nominated May-Parker to serve as a United States District Judge of the United States District Court for the Eastern District of North Carolina, to the seat vacated by Judge Malcolm Jones Howard, who took senior status on December 31, 2005. Her nomination was returned to the President at the sine die adjournment of the 113th Congress and she was not renominated in the 114th Congress.

See also
 Barack Obama judicial appointment controversies

References

1964 births
Living people
New York (state) lawyers
North Carolina lawyers
State University of New York at Geneseo alumni
University at Buffalo Law School alumni